The Church of the Good Shepherd in Rosemont, Pennsylvania, is a progressive Episcopal parish church in the liberal Anglo-Catholic tradition. It is part of the Episcopal Diocese of Pennsylvania and is located in the Philadelphia Main Line.

History
The parish was founded in 1869 as part of the Anglo-Catholic Oxford Movement revival in the Anglican Church, and was admitted to the Diocese of Pennsylvania in 1871. Its original church building was on the north side of Lancaster Avenue, just east of the present football stadium of Villanova University. Through a donation of $27,000 (approximately $823,000 in 2021 dollars) from parishioner Harry Banks French of the Smith, Kline & French company, the present church building was designed by the Philadelphia architectural firm of Baily & Truscott, and constructed between 1893 and 1894 in the Gothic Revival style of a 14th-Century English country church. The first services were held in 1894, and the building was consecrated in 1910.

Good Shepherd Hospital
The parish set up Good Shepherd Hospital in the 1870s, originally to care for children whose parents could not afford to give them medical services. In 1903 the name was changed to the Home and Hospital of the Good Shepherd, and in 1915 admissions were restricted to boys between 7 and 14. The hospital was conducted as a parochial institution until June 1922 when it merged with the Church Farm School, an Episcopal Church institution farther west in the Philadelphia suburbs.

Move from Radnor to Rosemont
The original church building near Villanova was in use for about 20 years. It had been informally intended to be, in part, a memorial to two distinguished Episcopal bishops (Jackson Kemper and Samuel Bowman). A window honoring the bishops was installed in the church. In the 1890s, the vestry decided to move to a more spacious location in neighboring Rosemont, Pennsylvania, and received the donation from Harry Banks French to erect what is today the church building.

Rectors

Current rector
The current rector, from August 2020, is the Rev. Kyle Babin. Babin holds a Bachelor of Music degree from Rice University, a Master of Music degree from Yale University with a certificate from the Yale Institute of Sacred Music, a Doctor of Musical Arts degree from the Manhattan School of Music, and a Master of Divinity degree from Virginia Theological Seminary. Immediately before accepting his call as rector, Babin was a member of the clergy of St. Mark’s Episcopal Church, an Anglo-Catholic parish in Philadelphia.

Art and architecture

Entrance and bell tower
Above the main (north) entrance to the church is a polychrome statue depicting the boy Jesus as the Good Shepherd. The crenellated bell tower contains bells playing the Cambridge Quarters, as well as ringing the Angelus and ringing before Mass; a bell elsewhere sounds during the eucharistic consecration. The chime of bells, donated in 1913, are playable from a console in the Lady Chapel. Ten of the bells are stationary; the largest (the 11th bell) can be swung.

Nave and stained glass

The nave comprises five bays and a clerestory with stained glass. In all, the building's stained glass includes 50 figurative windows and six ornamental windows.

Rood screen

A large carved wooden rood screen surmounted with a crucifixion separates the chancel from the nave. The screen was added to the building in 1912. Its gates are by celebrated blacksmith Samuel Yellin (1884-1940).

Chancel
The chancel contains a decorated coffered ceiling.

High altar and reredos
The high altar is made of Caen stone and was installed in 1905. In 1929 the artist and parishioner George Fort Gibbs created seven paintings for the high altar's reredos as a memorial to his parents. The center panel is a Virgin and Child flanked by panels depicting other figures from the Christian era and Old Testament: Saint Francis of Assisi, Saint Peter, King Saint Edward the Confessor (last king of the English House of Wessex), Moses, Aaron, and King David.

Lady chapel
There is a separate Lady chapel entered at the top of the south aisle, dedicated in 1918. The space was originally a sacristy and choir room. The current limestone altar was installed in 1954. The tabernacle and triptych, as well as the carved double-desk, are by parishioner Davis d’Ambly and date from the 1980s.

Baptistry
An octagonal baptistry with carved font and stained glass was added off the south side of the church in 1932. The chandelier is by Samuel Yellin and the glazing and polychrome are by Valentine d’Ogries (1889-1959).

War memorial
The war memorial, created in 1942, honors parishioners who have served in the armed forces in and since World War II. It was installed at the urging of a parishioner, Lt. Gen. Milton Baker, who also established the nearby Valley Forge Military Academy and College.

Crypt
There is a columbarium and funerary chapel in the crypt of the church, along with a burial vault containing the remains of benefactor Harry Banks French and members of his family.

Worship

Schedule
The church is open Monday through Friday for visits and meditation. Masses are celebrated on Sunday at 8:00 am (Low Mass) and at 10:30 am (Sung High Mass). Separate children's and adult formation classes are held at 9:30 am.

Morning Prayer is held on Monday to Saturday at 9:00 am and Evening Prayer on Monday to Friday at 5:30 pm.

Mass is also celebrated on Wednesdays, Fridays, and major holy days regardless of whether they fall on Wednesdays or Fridays.

Practice
As at other High Church, Anglo-Catholic churches, worship at Good Shepherd incorporates the later Catholic Revival's devotional and eucharistic practices:

 A robust program of classical and traditional Anglican church music in English and Latin during worship (see ”External Links” below for examples posted on YouTube)
 Elaborate eucharistic vestments
 Eastward-facing orientation of the priest at the altar instead of the priest facing the people
 Ringing of altar bells
 Mixing of water with the sacramental wine
 Use of incense during High Mass
 Numerous altar candles
 Multiple chancel lamps
 Periodic exhibition of the host in a monstrance
 Reservation of the Eucharist in a central tabernacle behind the high altar

Music program

The organist and choirmaster is Matthew Glandorf, a graduate of and faculty member at the Curtis Institute of Music.

The choir comprises a professional core with auditioned volunteer singers. The choir sings weekly at the 10:30 High Mass on Sunday, and at special liturgies throughout the year, including Advent, Christmas, Epiphany, Ash Wednesday, the solemn liturgies of Holy Week, Easter, and Pentecost. The choir offers a sung setting of the Mass on most Sundays and feast days ranging from Palestrina and Victoria to Stanford and Parry and the great English cathedral repertoire, as well as sacred music being written for the church today such as James MacMillan, Eriks Esenvalds, and local Philadelphia composers. The music program has a Choral Scholar Program for talented students from nearby colleges, including male and female choral scholars from, e.g., Bryn Mawr College, Villanova University, and Haverford College, to support them in their studies.

Organ
The organ at Good Shepherd is an Austin, Op. 2613 (1977), with three manuals and 57 ranks of pipes.

Gallery

Notes

See also
 Harvey Butterfield (former assistant)
 Church architecture
 Churchmanship
 Gothic architecture

References

Further reading

 Brown, Stewart J. & Nockles, Peter B. ed. The Oxford Movement: Europe and the Wider World 1830–1930, Cambridge: Cambridge University Press, 2012.
 Chadwick, Owen. Mind of the Oxford Movement, Stanford: Stanford University Press, 1960.
 Faught, C. Brad. The Oxford Movement: a thematic history of the Tractarians and their times, University Park, PA: Pennsylvania State University Press, 2003, 
 Rzeznik, Thomas F. Church and Estate: Religion and Wealth in Industrial Era Philadelphia. University Park, PA: Pennsylvania State University Press, 2013, 
 Walworth, Clarence A. The Oxford Movement in America. New York: United States Catholic Historical Society, 1974 (Reprint of the 1895 ed. published by the Catholic Book Exchange, New York).

External links

 Census of Stained Glass Windows in America: Church of the Good Shepherd

Non ministrari, sed ministrare: a tour of Good Shepherd, Rosemont

1869 establishments in Pennsylvania
19th-century Episcopal church buildings
Anglo-Catholic church buildings in the United States
Churches completed in 1894
Churches in Montgomery County, Pennsylvania
Church of the Good Shepherd
Gothic Revival church buildings in Pennsylvania
Religious organizations established in 1869